Columbia Correctional Institution may refer to:
Columbia Correctional Institution (Florida)
Columbia Correctional Institution (Wisconsin)